Desmond Roy Alexander MacDonald (4 July 1891 – 18 October 1941) was an Australian rules footballer who played with Melbourne in the Victorian Football League (VFL).

Notes

References
 Deaths: McDonald (sic), The Age, (Monday, 20 October 1941), p.1.

External links 
		
 
Roy MacDonald at Demonwiki

1891 births
1941 deaths
Australian rules footballers from Victoria (Australia)
Melbourne Football Club players